William Craig Bradshaw (born August 14, 1957) is a former professional American football quarterback in the National Football League.

Bradshaw was drafted in the 7th round (182nd overall) of the 1980 NFL Draft by the Houston Oilers and he played a total of two games in the 1980 season.

He is the brother of Pittsburgh Steeler Terry Bradshaw. The brothers were only the second set of brothers to play quarterback in the NFL, following Ed and Joey Sternaman in 1927 and were the first quarterbacks to play opposite one another in a game.

References

1957 births
Living people
Players of American football from Shreveport, Louisiana
American football quarterbacks
Louisiana Tech Bulldogs football players
Utah State Aggies football players
Houston Oilers players